Celista is a small community located along the north shore of Shuswap Lake in British Columbia, Canada.

The local school is North Shuswap Elementary school, which has grades one to eight and has an annual enrollment of just over 100 students. 
In recent years the exploding tourism industry has taken over and the majority of the residences are now owned for summer use only. Local residents have notable self pride and most are employed by local cash crops ranging in species. Other notable establishments within the community include: Celista Hall, used to host local meetings as well as the "coffee house" (a display of local musical talent) throughout the year. The Hall is also home to the Farmers Market during the summer season. https://bcfarmersmarkettrail.com/market/celista-hall-farmers-market/

 the Fetch Panda Market(formerly Sunnyside Supermarket Summer 2022) provides locals with movie rentals, groceries, cold beer and wine as well as gasoline and delicious fresh food. Other businesses in the community include a mechanic shop and Celista Estate Winery. There is also a community skating rink during the winter on Meadow Creek Road. There is a new boat launch next to Fetch Panda with ample parking. Opened  Summer 2022.

The area also holds a variety of hiking and walking trails including the Onyx Falls trail.

Name origin
The name is an adaptation of that of William Selesta, "the last of the Indian doctors", of the Neskonlith reserve, who died in 1948 near the age of 100. The name was originally applied to Celista Creek and used for the name of the settlement by one of its first residents.

Climate

See also
List of place names in Canada of Aboriginal origin

References

Designated places in British Columbia
Shuswap Country
Populated places in the Columbia-Shuswap Regional District